Canadian is the byname used in some countries for the descendants of the birch bark canoe that was used by the indigenous peoples of Northern America as a convenient means of transportation in the densely forested and impassable areas of Northern America.

In the United Kingdom and several other European countries the kayak is considered to be a kind of canoe. (Technically this is understandable, as one can easily see when a whitewater kayak is converted into a decked whitewater canoe just by taking the seat out and paddle it kneeling with a single blade paddle.) To distinguish canoes from kayaks, a touring, whitewater and racing canoe are then often called 'Canadian canoe' or 'Canadian' for short — e.g.
Canadier in German, Kanadensare in Swedish, Canadees in Dutch, et cetera.

This naming practice has led to confusion, with sea kayaks called sea canoes, kayakers called canoeists, and canoes sometimes even called 'Canadian kayaks'... It was one of the reasons why women were not allowed to canoe at the Olympic Games until 2020, as one of the arguments was that women were already allowed because a kayak is a canoe.

History 

The use of the byname 'Canadian' is the result of misinterpretations during the development of the sport of canoeing in the 19th century when an open touring canoe was called 'Canadian canoe' from the so called Canadian style canoe from Canada, the then more or less 'approved' open touring canoe by the American Canoe Association (ACA), as opposed to the wood-and-canvas touring canoe from Maine in the United States that was not officially recognized by the ACA until 1934.

For the canoeing clubs and associations of the late 19th century a canoe was a decked, double-ended boat, propelled with a double-blade paddle or sailed. At that time those organizations for large part consisted of somewhat elitist [wealthy] people with the opinion that one should be able to sail well with a touring canoe. Therefore, from the open canoes only the cedar-rib 'Canadian style' canoe was approved by them. The birchbark canoe was considered inferior and its direct descendant the wood-and-canvas canoe "a rag canoe, only suitable for workmen and primitive natives" [sic]. The wood-and-canvas canoe was however easier to manufacture and maintain than a cedar-rib canoe and therefore less expensive, which made it much more popular.

In America the canoe lost its qualifying prefix 'Canadian' not long afterwards. In several European countries though, people were not aware of these discrepancies and continued calling all kind of canoes 'Canadians' — even the decked whitewater canoes and, ironically, the wood-and-canvas canoe...

See also 
 Outline of Canoeing and Kayaking
 John MacGregor

Notes

References

General References

External links 
 Peterborough 'Canadian style' canoe at National Maritime Museum Cornwall
The 'Canadian style' canoe was based on both the dugout and birchbark canoe from the Algonquin and built with a cedar-rib construction, also sometimes dubbed as a "planked dugout"
 Payne dugout canoe at the Virtual museum of Canada.
The brothers Jacob Henry and William Alfred Payne of Warsaw, Ontario built this dugout canoe circa 1890. Instead of using a cedar-rib construction, they followed the tradition of carving a dugout canoe from a single basswood trunk but adopted the traditional shape of a birchbark canoe. The Algonquin style lines of the craft are related to the area in which the craft was built. The Warsaw, Ontario area is known for its rich canoe racing traditions.
 John Stephenson, supposed inventor of the cedar-rib canoe in Canada

Canoes
Fur trade